Las Vegas High School is a public high school in Sunrise Manor, Nevada, part of the Clark County School District. It is the oldest high school in Las Vegas and originally opened  in 1905 on what was then the outskirts of town. The school's first campus was made a permanent location in 1904 with a tent that opened in 1905. After 29 years the school built a new campus in 1930 that opened in 1931. Then, after 62 years the school moved to a new campus in 1993, located on the east side of Las Vegas along the foothills of Frenchman Mountain.

History 

Las Vegas High School's original campus was constructed a tent near the cottonwoods near north Creek of town for the 1905 school year. In 1911 High school classes were moved to the Clark County School at Fourth Street and Bridger Avenue, the precursor to Las Vegas High. Seventeen students were enrolled.

On December 17, 1917 a new Las Vegas High School is built at a cost of $42,500, opens at Fourth Street and Clark Avenue with 51 students. On May 11, 1934.  Las Vegas High was destroyed by a fire. A new high school was built in 1930 and caused much controversy at the time for its location. In the early 1930s, the new High School was considered to be quite distant from the rest of the town and was a commute for some students. The school originally had three buildings, the tri-level Main building on the corner of 7th and Bridger, the Gymnasium, and a third building that originally housed wood shops and vocational classes, and later government classes. It was torn down in 1969. Las Vegas High School is now a landmark in Las Vegas for it represents the best of the Art-Deco Style Architecture of the 1930s, that still stands in the city. The school's outer appearance has been maintained but the interior has been changed quite a bit since the original construction in the 1930s. Lieutenant William Harrell Nellis, for whom Nellis Air Force Base is named, graduated from Las Vegas High School.

During the late 1980s, the school district decided to build a new larger campus on the east side of Clark County. The original buildings that were Las Vegas High School are now the home to the Las Vegas Academy of International Studies, Performing, and Visual Arts, which opened in 1993.

Athletics 

Las Vegas High School's athletics teams are known as the Wildcats and participate in the Northeast Division of the Sunrise 4A Region. The Wildcats athletics programs are some of the best in the state and have won numerous championships with several in football, including the 1944 team which went all eight games without giving up a single point. The football team also has two historic rivalries, the Battle of Sunrise Mountain against Eldorado High School, which began in 1993 (and coined by a former 1985 graduate of Eldorado High School) and the Bone Game against Rancho High School, the latter of which is the oldest football rivalry in the state of Nevada. Las Vegas has won 22 consecutive games against Rancho, dating back to 1996.

Nevada Interscholastic Activities Association State Championships 
Baseball – 1968, 1971 
Basketball (Men's) – 1944, 1945, 1949, 1953, 1960, 1965, 1966, 1967, 1972, 1974, 1976
Basketball (Women's) – 1979
Bowling (Men's) – 2017
Football – 1931, 1932, 1933, 1934, 1938, 1944, 1945, 1947, 1951, 1953, 1954, 1957, 1959, 2001, 2005, 2006
Golf – 1966, 1970
Soccer (Boys) – 2008, 2009, 2018
Softball – 1982 
Volleyball (Boys) – 2005, 2008
Wrestling – 1985, 2001, 2002, 2010, 2011
Track & Field – 1930, 1933, 1939, 1941, 1946, 1947, 1948, 1949, 1953, 1954, 1955, 1956, 1957, 1958, 1959, 1962, 1963, 1965, 1972, 1973, 1993

Nevada Interscholastic Activities Association State Runners-Up 
Bowling (Men's) – 2014
Football – 2003, 2004
Softball – 2007
Track and Field (Men's) – 1999
Volleyball (Men's) – 2014, 2017
Wrestling – 1988, 1991, 2005, 2009

Nevada Interscholastic Activities Association Individual State Champions 

Bowling (Women's)(1) – 2014 Gabriella Weis
Golf (Men's)(1) – 2009 Ray Gillup
Track and Field (Men's) – 1998 Anthony Park, 1999 John Pollard, 2000 Anthony Parker, 2002 Cory Williams, 2009 Aaron Adkins, 2012 Tony Verdugo, 2016 Tre James,

Relay – 2001, 2015-400x2 (Elias Miller, Tre' James, Kalin Quailis, Eric Williams)

Track and Field (Women's) – 1998 Lillie Williams

Relay – 2007

Wrestling(42) - 1979 Adam Hilty, Ben Viray, 1980 Ben Viray, 1983 Tim Monahan, 1985 Mike Brewer, Joel Collins, Dave Rumfield, 1988 Simon Gutierrez, Joey Vidana, 1989 Mihn Nguyen, Scott Hocker, 1990 Frank Quintana, Damon Ruemmele, 1991 Pete Rayner, Rick Villalobos, Damon Ruemmele, 1996 Kelly Brinkerhoff, 1998 Eddy Gifford, 1999 Ricardo Osario, 2001 Greg Gifford, 2002 Chris Gifford, Greg Gifford, 2003 Chris Gifford, 2004 Chris Gifford, 2005 Nick Ruggiero, Zach Brewer, 2006 Mike Ruggiero, 2007 Jarell Price, Zach Hocker, 2009 Madison Hales, 2010 Alex Aniciete, Napoleon Aniciete, Trey McElhaney, 2011 Nathan Garcia, Alex Aniciete, Napoleon Aniciete, 2013 Christopher Caday, Alex Aniciete, 2014 Antonio Jauregui, 2015 Antonio Saldate, 2016 Antonio Saldate, 2017 Mauricio Jimenez

NIAA SUNRISE REGION CHAMPIONSHIPS - (1999–Present)

Basketball (Men's) - 2000, 2001, 2002

Basketball (Women's) - 2003

Bowling (Men's) - 2014, 2017

Football - 1999, 2001, 2003, 2004, 2005, 2006, 2007, 2008

Track and Field (Men's) - 2000

Soccer (Men's) - 1999, 2006, 2009

Softball - 2005, 2007

Volleyball (Men's) - 2005, 2010, 2014, 2015, 2017

Wrestling - 2001, 2002, 2003, 2004, 2005, 2006, 2007, 2008, 2009, 2010

Notable alumni 
Toni Basil (1961), pop singer
Sal Bernal (2011), Major League Soccer player
Tyler Bey (born 1998), basketball player in the Israeli Basketball Premier League, a 2020 NBA Draft prospect 
Richard Bryan (1955)
Gabriel Campisi (1986)
Brian Cram (1955), Clark County School Superintendent
Ricardo Dominguez (1978), co-founder of Electronic Disturbance Theater and professor at University of California, San Diego
Erick Fedde (2011), Major League Baseball player
Lloyd D. George (1948), United States federal judge, namesake of Lloyd D. George Federal Courthouse
Herculez Gomez (2000), soccer player
Bryce Harper (dropped out in 2008 to pursue a GED), Major League Baseball player
Che' Jones (1989), basketball player and college basketball coach
Sean Kazmar (2002), major league base ball player
Barbara Knudson, actress
Raúl Labrador (1985), congressman from Idaho
William Harrell Nellis (1934), namesake of Nellis Air Force Base
Marc Ratner (1963)
Sig Rogich (1962)
Larry Ruvo (1964)
Jack Lund Schofield (1941), Nevada state legislator
Dana Snyder (1992), stand-up comedian, actor, voice actor, and producer
Billy Winn (2007), professional football player
Bruce Woodbury (1962)

References

External links 
Official Alumni Association website
Official Athletics website
Las Vegas High School Athletic's Website Powered by UFans Sports
Las Vegas High School – High School Sports Streaming powered by SportsFrequency.com
Las Vegas High School Class of '62 reunion page

Clark County School District
1905 establishments in Nevada
Educational institutions established in 1905
Buildings and structures in Sunrise Manor, Nevada
High schools in Clark County, Nevada
Public high schools in Nevada